Ericameria teretifolia, known by the common name green rabbitbrush, is a North American species of flowering plants in the family Asteraceae. It is native to southern and eastern California, southern Nevada, and northwestern Arizona in the southwestern United States.

Ericameria teretifolia is a shrub up to 150 cm (5 feet) tall. Leaves are thread-shaped and terete (round in cross-section, very gradually tapering; the epithet teretifolia means "with terete leaves"). One plant can produce many small yellow flower heads each with 5-7 disc florets but no ray florets. The plant grows in desert regions, in flat plains, rocky slopes, and canyon walls.

References

teretifolia
Flora of the California desert regions
Flora of the Southwestern United States
Natural history of the Mojave Desert
Plants described in 1854
Taxa named by Willis Linn Jepson